Clausilia pumila is a species of air-breathing land snail, a terrestrial pulmonate gastropod mollusk in the family Clausiliidae.

Distribution 
This species occurs in:
 Czech Republic
 Ukraine

References

Clausiliidae
Gastropods described in 1828